Leschi was a steam ferry that operated on Lake Washington from 1913 to 1950, and afterwards on Puget Sound until 1967.  From 1969 to 1986 the vessel was a floating cannery in Alaska.

Career

The first ship ever commissioned by the Seattle Port Commission, and the first automobile ferry in Western Washington, 
Leschi was originally built as a side-wheel ferry by the Seattle firm of J. F. Duthie & Company.  The paddle wheels were designed to give less water resistance by "feathering" which allowed the vessel to move faster through the water.

The steel hull was built on the East Waterway of the Duwamish River.  Once the hull was complete, it was disassembled and transported to Rainier Beach on Lake Washington.  Once there, the hull was reassembled by J.F Dulthie, the machinery was installed, and the upper works (these were of wood) were constructed. The ferry was launched on December 6, 1913.  Conducting the christening was Eleanor Chittenden, daughter of the well-known Army engineer Hiram M. Chittenden (1858–1917), chairman of the Port Commission, who spoke at the ceremony.

In 1931 Leschi was rebuilt. The sidewheelers were removed and the ferry was converted to propeller drive. The steam engine was replaced by a  diesel. Later in 1931 the ferry was renamed the Ballard and placed on the Ballard to Suquamish run. Leschi continued to operate on Lake Washington even after the completion of the first floating bridge across the lake in 1940.

In 1948, Leschi was the last ferry operating on Lake Washington. Mrs. J.L. Anderson, the widow of Capt. John L. Anderson (1868–1941), was operating the vessel at that time. The city of Kirkland then took over operation of the ferry, with King County maintaining the two terminals at Madison Park and Kirkland.

Leschi remained in service on Lake Washington until 1950. The ferry was then transferred to the Vashon – Fauntleroy and the Mukilteo ferry routes.  In 1951 the then new Washington State Ferry system purchased Leschi.

In 1967, Leschi was sold to Cape St. Elias Ocean Products Company.  In 1969, at a cost of $200,000, Leschi was refitted at the Ballard Marine Center to serve as a cannery. The vessel then was transferred to Alaska where it was operated as floating salmon and crab cannery off Cordova and Valdez until 1986 when near Valdez the vessel capsized.

Notes

References 
 Faber, Jim, Steamer's Wake, Enetai Press, Seattle WA (1985) 
 Kline, M.S., and Bayless, G.A., Ferryboats -- A legend on Puget Sound, Bayless Books, Seattle, WA 1983 
 Newell, Gordon R., ed., H.W. McCurdy Marine History of the Pacific Northwest,  Superior Publishing Co., Seattle, WA (1966)
 Newell, Gordon R., ed. H. W. McCurdy Marine History of the Pacific Northwest 1966 to 1975, Superior Publishing (1976)
 Northwest Digital Archives (NWDA) Leschi Ferry Photograph Album Collection (accessed 05-20-11) Contains capsule history of Leschi and guide to 1913 photographs of the vessel (Collection No. 606)
 Stein, Alan J., "Leschi, the first auto ferry in Western Washington, is launched on Lake Washington on December 6, 1913.", HistoryLink.org Essay 2040 (February 10, 2013)
 Stein, Alan J., "The ferry Leschi makes its last run, ending ferry service on Lake Washington on August 31, 1950", HistoryLink.org Essay 2638 (August 30, 2000) (accessed 05-22-11)
 Department of Commerce, Bureau of Navigation, Seagoing Vessels of the United States (1918).

1913 ships
Steam ferries of Washington (state)
Steamboats of Washington (state)
Ships built by J. F. Duthie & Company